Douglass Stewart is a Latter-day Saint playwright most notable for having written Saturday's Warrior.  He also wrote the screenplay used in the 1974 film version of Where the Red Fern Grows. He was the moving creative force behind the creation of Tuacahn.

External links
 
 

American Latter Day Saints
American dramatists and playwrights
Living people
Year of birth missing (living people)
Place of birth missing (living people)
20th-century American male writers